"I've Got Your Number" is the debut solo single by Australian singer Cheyne Coates, after her departure from duo dance band Madison Avenue.

Track listing
CD Single
I've Got Your Number (Original)
I've Got Your Number (Rogue Traders Mix)
I've Got Your Number (16th Element Mix)
I've Got Your Number (Emc remix)
I've Got Your Number (A Cappella)

Charts

References

2004 debut singles
2004 songs
Songs written by Cheyne Coates